Sir James William Francis Hill  (15 September 1899 – 6 January 1980) was a British solicitor and leading historian of Lincoln and Lincolnshire. He was the third Chancellor of the University of Nottingham. He also served as a Councillor, Alderman and Mayor of Lincoln. The Sir Francis Hill Community Primary School in Bristol Drive, Lincoln was named in his honour.

Career
Sir Francis Hill was born in Lincoln and was educated at the Municipal Technical Day School (later City School), Monk's Road, Lincoln. He gained an open scholarship  to Trinity College, Cambridge, but first served at the end of the First World War in the King's Royal Rifle Corps. He graduated from Cambridge with a double first and proceeded to MA in 1925. From 1926 he was a qualified solicitor and he became a senior partner of the solicitors firm Andrew and Company of Lincoln. Sir Francis enjoyed a long and successful career in the civic governance as a councillor and later alderman of the City Council 1932-1974 and he was Mayor of Lincoln in 1945/1946. He became a member of the University of Nottingham College Council in 1934  and he was Chancellor of Nottingham University from 1972 to 1978.

Sir Francis was involved in municipal government both nationally and internationally. He was chairman of the Association of Municipal Corporations 1957–1966, president of the European Conference of Local Authorities 1966–1968, president of the International Union of Local Authorities 1967–1971, and a member of the Royal Commission on Local Government in England, 1966-1969 which produced the Redcliffe-Maud report.

Publications and articles by Sir Francis Hill
Medieval Lincoln, Cambridge University Press, 1948 xvii, 487 p. : ill., maps. 
Tudor and Stuart Lincoln,  Cambridge University Press, 
Georgian Lincoln, Cambridge University Press 1966
Victorian Lincoln, Cambridge University Press 1974. 
Early Days of a Society, Lincolnshire History and Archaeology Vol.1. pp 57–63

Bibliography
Baker F.T (1992), Sir Francis Hill in C. Sturman, (ed.),   Some historians of Lincolnshire (Occasional papers in Lincolnshire History and Archaeology,no. 9 -Society for Lincolnshire History and Archaeology, Lincoln)

References

1899 births
1980 deaths
People associated with the University of Nottingham
Commanders of the Order of the British Empire
Knights Bachelor
Lincolnshire Antiquary
Councillors in Lincolnshire
Fellows of the Society of Antiquaries of London
Mayors of Lincoln, England